Juhan Aavik  (29 January 1884, in Holstre, Kreis Fellin, Governorate of Livonia, Russian Empire – 26 November 1982, in Stockholm, Sweden) was an Estonian composer.

Aavik studied music composition at the Saint Petersburg Conservatory. He later served as a conductor in Tartu, Governorate of Livonia (1911–1925), a musical conservatory professor and director in Tallinn (1928–1944), and an Estonian song festival conductor in Sweden (1948–1961) (after arriving there in 1944). He wrote nearly 200 Opus numbers, among them two symphonies; a Cello concerto (1949); a Double bass Concerto (1950); a Piano trio (1957); a Requiem (1959); and various choral works, songs and chamber music. In Stockholm at age 81 (1965–1969), he published a history of Estonian music in four volumes.

References
 Slonimsky, Nicolas – Baker's Biographical Dictionary of Musicians, 7th ed. 1984. New York, NY: Schirmer Books. .

External links
 

1884 births
1982 deaths
People from Viljandi Parish
People from Kreis Fellin
20th-century Estonian composers
Estonian conductors (music)
Saint Petersburg Conservatory alumni
Recipients of the Military Order of the Cross of the Eagle, Class III
Recipients of the Order of the White Star, 3rd Class
Estonian World War II refugees
Estonian emigrants to Sweden